Osmium pentacarbonyl is the organoosmium compound with the formula Os(CO)5.  It is the simplest isolatable carbonyl complex of osmium.  Osmium pentacarbonyl is a colorless volatile liquid that is obtained by treating solid triosmium dodecacarbonyl under 200 atmospheres of carbon monoxide at 280-290 °C.  In contrast, also at 200 atm of CO, solid Ru3(CO)12 converts to Ru(CO)5 at milder temperature of 160 °C.

Reactions

Samples of Os(CO)5 convert back to the trioosmium cluster upon heating to 80 °C. The analogous conversion of Ru(CO)5 back to Ru3(CO)12 occurs at room temperature. 
Chlorination of the pentacarbonyl gives a cationic pentacarbonyl complex:
Os(CO)5  +  Cl2  →  [Os(CO)5Cl]+Cl−

Upon UV irradiation, hexane solutions of the pentacarbonyl react with ethylene to give mono-, di-, and trisubstituted derivatives:
Os(CO)5  +  nC2H4  →  Os(CO)5-n(C2H4)n  +  nCO (n = 1,2,3)

References

Organoosmium compounds
Carbonyl complexes
Osmium compounds